Beatrice Venetia Stanley Montagu (22 August 1887 – 3 August 1948) was a British aristocrat and socialite best known for the many letters that Prime Minister H. H. Asquith wrote to her between 1910 and 1915.

Life
The youngest daughter of Edward Lyulph Stanley, 4th Baron Sheffield and Stanley of Alderley, Venetia was a namesake and collateral descendant of Venetia Stanley (1600–1633).

Venetia met Asquith through her close friendship with his daughter, Violet. Asquith, who enjoyed writing letters to women in high society, began his correspondence with Venetia in 1910. However, Venetia was just one of several women who received Asquith's letters until 1912, when she went on a trip to Sicily with Asquith, Violet and Edwin Montagu, a Liberal MP who was one of Asquith's protégés. It seems that on this trip both Asquith and Montagu fell in love with Venetia. 

During the next three years, Asquith wrote more and more frequently to Venetia, even during Cabinet meetings. Venetia seems to have written to Asquith almost as often, but Asquith apparently destroyed Venetia's letters on a regular basis to maintain confidentiality. There has been a debate since 1982 as to whether the affair was sexually consummated or not. At the same time, Montagu was attempting to court Venetia and unsuccessfully proposed marriage to her in 1913. Venetia liked Montagu but did not reciprocate his love. Also, Montagu had to marry within his Jewish faith to keep his inheritance. Although Venetia was from a freethinking family and was not a devout Anglican, conversion to Judaism seemed too great a barrier.

Asquith's epistolary obsession with Venetia (by early 1915, he was writing her up to three letters a day) was not just an emotional dependence. He also sought her advice on how to deal with his political colleagues and even on questions of military strategy in the First World War. The letters he wrote to her during Cabinet meetings are often the only minutes of those meetings that exist and a crucial source of historical information on the formation of British strategy during the war. Although Venetia was intelligent, well-read, and keenly interested in politics, she apparently felt overwhelmed by Asquith's demands. As a result, she finally accepted Montagu's proposal on 28 April 1915 and wrote to Asquith of her decision on 12 May. After converting to Judaism, Venetia married Montagu on 26 July 1915.

She was unhappy in her marriage and had several affairs, including one with the press magnate Lord Beaverbrook. In 1923, she bore a daughter, Judith, who was said to be the child of William Humble Eric Ward, then Viscount Ednam and later 3rd Earl of Dudley. Judith grew up to befriend Princess Margaret during the Second World War and marry the American photographer Milton Gendel, with whom she created an artistic salon in Italy.

Despite Venetia's affairs, her marriage lasted until Montagu's premature death in 1924. Once a widow, she renewed her friendship with Asquith. Asquith's final excursion before his death in 1928 was a visit to her. The same year, the Liberal Party invited her to stand as a parliamentary candidate for South Norfolk, where she had inherited Montagu's country house in Attleborough, but she declined the offer.

After being widowed, she took an interest in flying. In 1931, she embarked on a 6,000-mile adventure in a DH Gypsy Moth piloted by Rupert Belleville. The journey took them across Russia, the Middle East and Persia. Of the journey she said that, "We are going for fun only, in the simplest, cheapest, and most modern way of seeing the world". 

Venetia Stanley Montagu died of cancer in 1948, shortly before her 61st birthday.

Further reading
 Asquith, H.H. H.H. Asquith: Letters to Venetia Stanley. Ed. Michael Brock and Eleanor Brock. Oxford: Oxford University Press, 1982.
 Stefan Buczacki, My Darling Mr Asquith: The Extraordinary Life and Times of Venetia Stanley. Cato and Clarke, 2016. "When Asquith’s letters to Venetia were published in 1982, edited by Michael and Eleanor Brock, only around half of the total 300,000 words were included. Buczacki has read the other half and found that the editors omitted a lot of social gossip and an even larger quantity of 'desperately boring material. . .'"
 Jenkins, Roy. Asquith: Portrait of a Man and an Era. 1964. Rev. ed. London: Collins, 1978.
 Levine, Naomi B. Politics, Religion and Love: the Story of H.H. Asquith, Venetia Stanley and Edwin Montagu. New York: New York University Press, 1991.
 Susan Howatch's 1990 novel Scandalous Risks is a fictionalised version of the relationship between Venetia Stanley ("Venetia Flaxton") and H. H. Asquith ("Neville Aysgarth"), but set in the early 1960s.
 Bobbie Neate's 2012 work  Conspiracy of Secrets claims, unsupported by evidence, that her stepfather Louis Stanley was the illegitimate son of Asquith and Venetia Stanley.

References 

1887 births
1948 deaths
British people of World War I
British socialites
British Jews
Deaths from cancer in England
Converts to Judaism
Daughters of barons
Venetia
Venetia